Jocelyn "Joy" Bisco (born October 15, 1975) is a Filipino American actress.

She graduated from University City High School in San Diego, California. Her movie credits include The Debut and Not Another Teen Movie.

Film credits
Ghost World (2000) - Jade
The Debut (2001) - Annabelle
Not Another Teen Movie (2001) - Ashley
Lumpia (2003) - Narrator

TV

Starring
Days of Our Lives - Gabby (2007)
Port Charles - Casey Leong/Marissa Leong (2002–2003)
One on One - Nurse Girl
Blade Squad - Kimiko
The Game - Corazon

Guest roles
CSI: Crime Scene Investigation  (Meet Market - Feb. 1, 2007) - Cotton Candy
Desperate Housewives (2005, 2006) - Melanie Foster
The Division (Ep. 4x01 - Jan. 11, 2004) - Marsha Hong
The Bold and the Beautiful (Oct. 1, 2001) - Principal
ER (18 November 1999) - Nurse (uncredited)
Diagnosis: Murder (Ep. 4x11 - Nov. 21, 1996) - Student
JAG (Ep.1x05 Oct. 21, 1995)  - Gym
Strange Luck (Ep. 1x06 - Oct 20, 1995) - Yolanda Morales

External links

1975 births
Living people
American film actresses
American television actresses
American actresses of Filipino descent
21st-century American women